Rutinose is the disaccharide also known as 6-O-α-L-rhamnosyl-D-glucose (C12H22O10) that is present in some flavonoid glycosides. It is prepared from rutin by hydrolysis with the enzyme rhamnodiastase.

References

Disaccharides
Deoxy sugars